Vartul is a 2009 Indian short film written and directed by Santosh Ram and produced by Vivek Chitra Production & Mokal Films.

Production
The leading cast of the movie consisted of Ashwini Giri, Chinmay Patwardhan, Ajinkya Bhise and Shailesh Shankar Kulkarni. The production of the film commenced in May 2008 and was completed in July 2009. The crew were selected by Vivek Chitra Production. The movie was shot in Bhor Maharashtra on a very tight budget. The crew faced various difficulties due to the shoestring budget.

Plot 
The movie revolves around Damu, a 10-year-old boy. There is a festival so mother wants to make Sweet. Mother asks Damu to go to shop and bring the jagarry. Damu has to take the money from the box, but he observes that there is no more money other than one coin left in the box. He leaves his home to buy Jagarry. On the way, he meets his friend Ganya. Ganya proposes for a race and Damu immediately accepts it. On the way to shop they stop at a Bioscopewallah. Ganya wants to watch the show of Bioscopewallah and he asks Damu to join him. Damu realizes that he does not have enough money, he wants to watch the show but he has to deny it. Damu realizes that he does not have enough money and he has to go to the shop and bring the Jagarry for the sweets. After the show Damu curiously asks Ganya about it. Ganya narrates the things to Damu on the bicycle ride they enjoy together.

Someone from the corner shouts for Ganya and asks him to join the game. Ganya and Damu leave the bicycle side of the road. They go there and see that Ganya's friends are playing game of money. The game is you have to hit a coin with a stone slab. Ganya joins the game. Everyone is winning the money this greed takes him to play a game. Damu decides to earn some quick money by playing the game. He starts playing the game. Beginners luck works in the case of Damu. Initially he wins the games  and his greed for money grows more.

After the game, Damu goes to the shop. Damu asks the shopkeeper to give him the jaggery. The shopkeeper gives him the jaggery and in exchange of that Damu puts money in the hands of the shopkeeper. The shopkeeper looks at the defaced coin and tells Damu that the coin doesn't work. Damu requests shopkeeper but the shopkeeper asks for different coin. Now Damu walks back with tearful eyes.

Cast
 Aswini Giri - Mother
 Chinmay Patwardhan - Damu
 Ajinkya Bhise -Manya
 Kalyan Gadgil -Kallya
 Aakash Giri - Akya
 Shivam Chetan Moray - Shivya
 Anant Shankar Salunke - Antya
 Jayesh Dikhale - Jivnya
 Rohan Choudhari - Rohnya
 Karan Lokhande - Dinya
 Shailesh Shankar Kulkarni - Shopkeeper
 Vinod Anand Kamble - Villager
 Vijay Kadam - Bioscopewallah

Crew
 Story, Screenplay: Santosh Ram
 Producers: Ramchandra Pundlikrao Marewad, Mokal Brothers 
 Editor: Vinod Gama Borate
 Cinematography: Pravin Mokal
 Music: Shrirang Umrani
 Editor: Vinod Gama Borate
 Art Director: Santosh Sankhad
 Re-recording: Mahesh Limaye
 Costume Design: Sonali Santosh Sankhad
 Sound recordist: Rashi Butee
 Promo Editor : Vaibhav Dabhade

Awards and recognition 
Since its world premiere in July 2009, the film has been selected for 50 Film Festivals across the world, winning thirteen awards.

List of officially selected film festivals

1. 2nd Nashik International Film Festival 2009, Nashik, India
2. Third Eye 8th Asian Film Festival 2009, Mumbai, India 
3. 11th Osian's Cinefan Film Festival 2009, New Delhi, India
4. 7th Kalpanirjhar International Short Fiction Film Festival, Kolkata, India
5. 8th Pune International Film Festival 2010, Pune, India
6. 2nd Jaipur International Film Festival 2010, Jaipur, India
7. 9th International Social Communication Cinema Conference 2010, Kolkata, India
8. The Fourth National Short And Documentary Film Festival 2010, Karimnagar A.P., India
9. ViBGYOR International Film Festival 2010, Thrissur, Kerla, India
10. Kala Ghoda Arts Film Festival 2010, Mumbai (India)
11. 2nd CMS International Children's Film Festival (6–12 April 2010), Lucknow, India
12. 2nd Thendhisai International Short Film Festival of Madurai 2010, Tamil Nadu, India
13. Third Eye 2nd Asian Film Festival 2010, Kolhapur, India
14. 12th Madurai International Documentary and Short Film Festival 2010 (opening film)
15. Ankur Film Festival 2010, Nashik, India
16. Fourth International Short Film Festival of India 2010, Chennai, India
17. 3rd International Documentary and Short Film Festival Of Kerala, 2010, India
18. SCRIPT International Short Film Festival 2011, Kochi, India
19. 2nd International Film Festival Nagpur 2011, Nagpur, India
20. 1st Guwahati International Short Film Festival, 2011 Guwahati (India)
21. Pune Short Film Festival 2011 (India )
22. Pu La Utsav 2011 Pune (India)
23. International Short Film Festival 2011, Bhubaneswar, India
24. Gujarat International Short Film Festival 2011, Surat, India
25. 5th Chinh India Kids Film Festival 2011, New Delhi, India
26. Dada Saheb Phalke Film Festival-2012, Greater Noida, India.
27. FFSI Short & Documentary Film Festival 2012 Kolkata (India ).
28. 4th Lahore International Children's Film Festival 2012 (Pakistan ).
29. Jagran Film Festival 2012 (India ).
30. IGNITE Short Film Festival 2013, Vijayawada, Andhra Pradesh, India
31. 6th Filmsaaz, an International film festival of short films and documentaries 2013. (India ).
32. Tinsukia Orange Film Festival 2013
33. ICONOCLAST-2013 National short film festival Mumbai (India )
34. 6th Goa Marathi Film Festival 2013 (India)
35. The Art Factory: Sunday Flix, A new independent film series 2013 Paterson, NJ (USA)
36. Malabar Short Film Festival 2013, Calicut (India)
37. International Film Festival Of Kanyakumari 2013 (India)
38. No Gloss Film Festival 2013,  Leeds, UK.
39. Lakecity International Short Film Festival 2013 (India)
40. South Texas Underground Film Festival 2013, Texas (USA)
41. Free Spirit Film Festival 2013, McLeod Ganj, Himachal Pradesh (India )
42. 17th Toronto Reel Asian International Film Festival 2013 (Canada)
43. The 9th Annual Free Spirit Film Festival 2013, McLeod Ganj ( India )
44. Midnapore International Film Festival 2013, West Bengal (India)
45. 4th International Random Film Festival 2013, Garpenberg  (Sweden )
46. 2nd Shaan-e-awadh International Film Festival 2013 Lucknow, India.
47. Navi Mumbai International Film Festival 2014 Navi Mumbai, India.
48. 9th Children's India International Children's Film Festival 2014, Bangalore (India). 
49. Darbhanga International Film Festival 2014, Darbhanga (India).
50. Barshi Short Film Festival 2014 (India).
51. Warnanagar Short Film Festival 2014 (India )
52. 5th National Show of Independent Cinema "Otros Cines", San Nicolas (Argentina) 2014.
53. 1st Maharashtra Short Film Festival 2014 (India).
54.  1st Goa Short Film Festival 2014 (India).

References

External links 

 

2009 films
2009 short films
Indian short films
2000s Marathi-language films